The 2011 Brown Bears football team represented Brown University in the 2011 NCAA Division I FCS football season. The Bears were led by 14th year head coach Phil Estes and played their home games at Brown Stadium. They are a member of the Ivy League. They finished the season 7–3 overall and 4–3 in Ivy League play to tie for second place. Brown averaged 5,046 fans a game.

Schedule

References

Brown
Brown Bears football seasons
Brown Bears football